The 2013 Team Ice Racing World Championship was the 35th edition of the Team World Championship. The final was held on 25/26 January, 2013, in Sanok, in Poland. Russia won their 11th consecutive title and 19th title overall.

Daniil Ivanov defeated Franz Zorn in the run off to determine the world champions after both nations ended with 55 points each.

Final Classification

See also 
 2013 Individual Ice Racing World Championship
 2013 Speedway World Cup in classic speedway
 2013 Speedway Grand Prix in classic speedway

References 

Ice speedway competitions
World